Torud (also Romanized as Torūd and Ţorūd; also known as Touroud, Turūd, and Turut) is a village in Torud Rural District, in the Central District of Shahrud County, Semnan Province, Iran. At the 2006 census, its population was 1,901, in 410 families.

References 

Populated places in Shahrud County